The  were World War II Japanese aircraft carriers. Sixteen ships of the class were planned under the Maru Kyū Programme (Ship #302 in 1941) and the Kai-Maru 5 Programme (#5001–5015 in 1942). However, only three of the Unryū-class carriers were completed.

Design

In the lead-up to the Pacific War the Imperial Japanese Navy (IJN) attempted to build a large number of fleet carriers.

The Unryū-class aircraft carrier design was very similar to that of Hiryū. The ships were lightly built, and the main difference from Hiryū was that the carriers' island was placed on the starboard side of the ships. The carriers were capable of carrying 63 aircraft in two hangars, and were fitted with two elevators. The Unryū class carried a smaller quantity of aviation fuel than Hiryū with fuel tanks protected by concrete. The carriers also had a similar armament as Hiryū and were equipped with two Type 21 radars and two Type 13 radars.

Construction

The first three Unryū-class aircraft carriers were laid down in 1942 and construction of a further three began the next year. Eventually, only three (and ) were completed and construction of the other three carriers (and ) was abandoned in 1945.

Ships in classes

Unryū class
Project number was G16. General production model of the Unryū class. 3 carriers were completed.
 Unryū (built by Yokosuka Naval Arsenal used the same boilers and turbines as the heavy cruiser Suzuya.
 Amagi and Kasagi (built by Mitsubishi, Nagasaki Shipyard) were equipped with surplus stock of the Ibuki-class cruiser machinery.
 Katsuragi and Aso (built by Kure Naval Arsenal) were equipped with two sets of the  machinery, because Japanese industry power became scarce. Dead space was replaced by fuel tanks.
 Ship Number 5002 and 5005 (built by Yokosuka Naval Arsenal) were to have been built simultaneously using 's dock. However, they were cancelled because Shinano was continued.

Ikoma class
The Ikoma subclass was a simplified and sped-up construction model of the Unryū class. They were equipped with shift-arrangement machinery (four sets of parallel boilers and one turbine). Therefore, their funnels were intended to be spaced out.

Photos

Footnotes

References
 
 
 
 
 Shizuo Fukui, "Stories of Japanese aircraft carriers", Kōjinsha (Japan) August 1996, 
  History of Pacific War Extra, "Perfect guide, The aircraft carriers of the Imperial Japanese Navy & Army", Gakken (Japan), April 2003, 
 Daiji Katagiri, Ship Name Chronicles of the Imperial Japanese Navy Combined Fleet, Kōjinsha (Japan), June 1988, 
 , National Archives of Japan, "List of main points and features of surface vessels under construction", Reference code: A03032074600
 Monthly Ships of the World,  (Japan)
 No. 481, Special issue, "History of Japanese Aircraft Carriers", May 1994
 No. 736, Special issue, "History of Japanese Aircraft Carriers" (New edition), January 2011
 The Maru Special, Ushio Shobo (Japan)
 Warship Mechanism Vol. 3, "Mechanisms of Japanese 29 Aircraft Carriers", August 1981
 Japanese Naval Vessels No. 23, "Japanese aircraft carriers I", January 1979
 Senshi Sōsho, Asagumo Simbun (Japan)
 Vol. 31, Naval armaments and war preparation (1), "Until November 1941", November 1969
 Vol. 88, Naval armaments and war preparation (2), "And after the outbreak of war", October 1975

Notes

External links

 

Aircraft carrier classes